In the Club is a British drama television series that was first broadcast on BBC One on 5 August 2014. The series follows six couples who attended a local Parent Craft class during their pregnancy. The series was written and created by Kay Mellor. A second series was commissioned in 2014 and broadcast in the UK from 3 May to 7 June 2016.

Production
On 18 June 2013, BBC One announced the commissioning of the series. The series was commissioned by Danny Cohen, former controller of BBC One, and Ben Stephenson, controller of BBC Drama commissioning. Filming took place in Leeds from January 2014 several scenes of which took part in Allerton High School.

Cast
Main cast
Hermione Norris as Roanna Wilson, a 40-something woman who gives up her marriage, family and successful business to be with her 27-year-old boyfriend, Simon. She and Simon have a son together called Sonny. She has met Simon's parents and seems to know Simon's father, Jonathan, from an earlier time. Simon's mum Emma and Simon are not aware of this, but her ex-husband Ray is aware of what has happened between Roanna and Jonathan. Her now ex-husband declares that he still loves her.
Katherine Parkinson as Kim Hall, a part-time teaching assistant who works at the same school that Rosie and her girlfriend Susie's son Jude attends. She has her own website, Kim and the bump, which offers advice for other expectant mums. Her and Susie's relationship faces some tensions when Kim supports Rosie, Jude's girlfriend. She has a close relationship with her baby's biological father Neil. She gives birth to a daughter named Emily. In series 2, she is in a romantic relationship with Neil. Kim wants to be a good mother to her daughter. She is the main godmother to Jude and Rosie's daughter Dinah, but she feels guilty on how things ended between her and Susie when she and Neil got together.
Jill Halfpenny as Diane Manning, a woman who has struggled to naturally conceive with her husband Rick. She is the mother to her two adoptive children Ellie and Sam. She is happy about the arrival of her twins Hope and Zack and she is worried, as her husband may soon face prison for robbing a bank. She has no money (her husband did not tell her he had been made redundant) and Hope is critically ill. Diane gets her licence as a child minder, and gets income this way.
Christine Bottomley as Victoria "Vicky" Brierly, a midwife at the hospital who goes the extra mile for her patients. Along with her colleagues, Geraldine and Fiona, she holds parenting classes that the others attend. She is pregnant and wants to get married before her baby is born, if only she can convince the baby's father, Dr Chris Bellingham. Her colleagues have no idea that Dr Bellingham is her baby's father. She gives birth to her and Chris' son named Ben. In series 2, she is working full-time and looking after her son Ben alone while Chris is travelling to find the woman he married years ago for money. She faces her biggest challenge of her midwife career when a new mother died after she delivered the baby, after the inquest, Vicky wasn't to blame. Chris returns from his travels.
Taj Atwal as Jasmin Sidhwa, a woman who is unsure if the father of her unborn baby is her husband Dev or her ex-boyfriend Jack. She gives birth to a daughter called Amber. Later hospital tests confirmed that her husband Dev is the father to their daughter. In Series 2, she and Dev are expecting twins and facing the biggest decision of their lives after an ultrasound scan reveals some devastating news.
Hannah Midgley as Rosie Hutchinson, a fifteen-year-old school girl who gets pregnant after her first time with boyfriend Jude. She kept her pregnancy a secret from everyone including her widowed father. She found comfort from Kim's website. She gives birth to a daughter and names her Dinah after her late mother. After Rosie has given birth, she learns that her father has been badly injured in a car accident and cannot support her. She is supported by Kim. Rosie announces that the father of her daughter is Jude. In Series 2, Rosie and Jude are in a relationship; they are expecting their second child. Rosie gives birth in a stalled lift, with aid from Jude, to their second daughter named Davina. She, Jude and their children now live in her father's flat after some tensions between Jude's mum Susie and her new partner Claire.
Sacha Dhawan as Devan "Dev" Sidhwa, Jasmin's husband and is the father of their daughter. In Series 2, Dev and Jamsin are facing the biggest decision of their lives after an hospital visit reveals some devastating news about their unborn twins.
Will Mellor as Richard "Rick" Manning, Diane's husband and father of their two adoptive children and the soon-to-be-born twins. He robs a bank after he could not afford to pay for his children's lunch. In Series 2, when he returns home from serving his sentence, he realises that his wife is a child-minder and helps her out. Whilst helping her out one of the children hurts her arm, so he takes everyone to hospital. The little girl is fixed up, but hospital personnel challenge Diane's status as a child minder. Diane is then told that she can only do her job if her husband is not in the house.
Jonathan Kerrigan as Neil, father of Jude, and he is father of Kim's baby. He and Kim share a close and growing relationship. Kim gives birth to a girl called Emily. He learned that his son Jude is the father to Rosie's daughter Dinah. In series 2, he and Kim are in romantic relationship, but he is aware that Susie is in a new relationship and kept it from Kim.
Luke Thompson as Simon Lambert, Roanna's 27-year-old boyfriend, who is an art graduate student. His parents are Jonathan and Emma. He and Roanna are parents to a son named Sonny.
Tara Fitzgerald as Susie, she is the mother of Jude, whose father is Neil. She is Kim's girlfriend at the start. Their relationship faces some tensions, because she does not like it when Kim shows support towards Rosie. Then she learns that her son Jude is the father of Rosie's daughter Dinah. She later notices how close Kim and Neil are and ends her friendship with Kim. In Series 2, she is in a new relationship with Claire. The house she shared with Kim has been sold. She plans to travel with Claire but faces tensions with her son Jude and Rosie.
John Marquez as Ray Wilson (series 2, recurring series 1), is Roanna's soon-to-be ex-husband and father to her older children. He owns a recruitment company, and he and Roanna are getting a divorce. In series 2, Ray and Roanna are now divorced. He gives Roanna some of her settlement money from their divorce after she asks him for help. He is aware of Roanna's history with Jonathan, and also declares that he still has feelings for her.
Brendan Patricks as Dr Chris Bellingham, a doctor at the hospital who is in a relationship with midwife Vicky and is the father of her baby. Their colleagues are not aware of the relationship. Vicky gives birth to their son named Ben. In Series 2, Vicky mentions that he is travelling to find the wife, whom he married for money, to divorce her. Once divorced, he can marry Vicky. He later returns home after traveling.
Sandra Huggett as Maxine (series 2), works as a cleaner for  Nathan and Andrew. Maxine and her husband Micky have an on-again, off-again relationship. Her daughter Shelley is expecting a child for her bosses. Maxine is worried Shelly has not thought surrogacy through. Maxine finds a newborn baby boy in a hospital toilet. The hospital staff name the baby Louie. Eventually Maxine confesses that she is the mother of this baby boy.
Gemma Dobson as Shelly (series 2), she's Maxine's daughter and expecting a child for her mum's bosses Nathan and Andrew. Now, she is in the last trimester of her pregnancy and thinks it is the perfect way to make some money; £10k for a healthy baby.
Paul Nicholls as Nathan (series 2), is a successful interior designer who lives with his long-term partner Andrew. Their cleaner's daughter, Shelly agrees to help them out when they say they would pay her to carry their child.
Andrew Buckley as Andrew (series 2), is very excited to become a father and has taken as much paternity leave as possible from his job. He is busy rushing around to get everything ready, buying provisions they need for the arrival of their child and wants updates from Shelly.
Neil Pearson as Jonathan Lambert (series 2, recurring series 1) is Simon's father. He seems to know his son's partner Roanna from a previous time, of which his wife Emma and his son Simon are not aware.

Supporting cast
Steven Elder as Dave Hutchinson.
Will Tudor as Jack Moorhouse (Series 1), a solicitor, who is Jasmin's ex-boyfriend and could be the father of her baby, however later on, tests reveal that he is not the father.
Lorraine Cheshire as Geraldine Parks, a senior midwife at the hospital, who holds parenting classes along with her colleagues Vicky and Fiona.
Shobna Gulati as Fiona (Series 1), a midwife at the hospital, who holds parenting classes along with her colleagues Vicky and Geraldine.
Daniel 'Danny' Breeze as Jude, son of Neil and Susie. His mother's girlfriend is Kim, who works as a teaching assistant at the school he attends.  He's later named as the father of Rosie's baby daughter Dinah and he is also the half-brother to his dad Neil and Kim's daughter Emily. In Series 2, Jude and Rosie are in a romantic relationship, they are expecting their second child. He passed his resits exams, and plans to attend night school to study for his A-Levels exams while he's working. He delivered his second child while he, Rosie and Dinah were in a broken down lift. Rosie gave birth to their second daughter named Davina. He, Rosie and their children are now living at Rosie's father's flat after tensions between his mum and her new partner Claire.
Lily Mae as Ellie Manning, Rick and Diane's daughter
Lewis Hardaker as Sam Manning, Rick and Diane's young son
Victoria Carling as Emma Lambert, Simon's mother.
Mina Anwar as Amita, Jasmin's mother
Claire Cooper as Claire (series 2), is in a relationship with Susie. She is godmother to Rosie and Jude's daughter Dinah after Susie requested it to make Claire feel welcome into the family. Claire and Susie plan to travel but face tensions between Jude and Rosie.
Ashley McGuire as Annette Harris (series 1)
Hannah Waddingham as Dr Stone (Series 2), works as a doctor at the hospital with Geraldine and Vicky.

Episodes

Series overview

Series 1 (2014)

Series 2 (2016)
In September 2014, it was announced that In the Club has been renewed for a second series for another six episodes in 2015.
Creator Kay Mellor has said: "I'm absolutely delighted for Rollem Productions to be commissioned to produce a second series of In the Club for BBC One. On a personal note, the whole experience from script to screen was such a positive one for me. It's going to be a bit of a juggling process as I'd love to bring all the characters back but I also want to introduce some new stories. One thing’s for sure, I can’t wait to start the whole process again." BBC One controller Charlotte Moore also mentions: "BBC One viewers really took the characters to their hearts and it was exciting to see the show build across the six episodes. Kay Mellor's story about a group of pregnant women celebrated life in all its joy and tragedy and I'm looking forward to the delivery of series two." Filming for the second series will take place in Leeds in 2015. It was announced in 2015 that Series 2 would air in 2016.

Kay Mellor directed the first two episodes. Her daughter Gaynor Faye (Credited as Gaynor Mellor) wrote Episode 2 alongside Kay Mellor, while Nick Hopkins co-wrote Episode 3 with Kay Mellor.

International broadcast
In Australia, the series premiered on 4 May 2015 on BBC First.

References

External links
 
 
 

2014 British television series debuts
2016 British television series endings
2010s British drama television series
BBC television dramas
English-language television shows
Pregnancy-themed television shows
Television series about dysfunctional families
Television shows set in Leeds